Čimhová is a village and municipality in Tvrdošín District in the Žilina Region of the northern Slovakia. It has over 600 inhabitants and lies on the banks of Oravica river, in the Orava Basin, near the Slovak-Polish border.

History
In historical records the village was first mentioned in 1438. The prime settlements were established as part of the colonisation period which started in the 13th century. The house of Platthy received the area as a donation from the king Albert II of Germany, as a recognition for their service in fighting against the Turks. The name 'Chemechowá' (original from 1428) is derived from the flowering plant bird cherry, 'čremcha' (in Slovak) or 'chemecha' (in the local dialect). The name has been under evolution, as the scribes and officials of the kingdom have been of Hungarian or German origin. The name has also been a target for mockeries from the officials of Orava County, which harbored negative stance to the village's owners, the house of Platthy originally from the Liptov County. This conflict of nobility has been a cause of many historical events which ultimately gave shape to the realities present in the contemporary towns and villages located in Orava Basin.

Geography
The municipality lies at an altitude of 644 metres and covers an area of 6.388 km². It has a population of about 645 people.

Genealogical resources

The records for genealogical research are available at the state archive "Statny Archiv in Bytca, Slovakia"

 Roman Catholic church records (births/marriages/deaths): 1787-1879 (parish A)

See also
 List of municipalities and towns in Slovakia

References

External links
http://www.statistics.sk/mosmis/eng/run.html
Surnames of living people in Cimhova

Villages and municipalities in Tvrdošín District